"Bleed It Out" is a song by American rock band Linkin Park. The song was released as the second single from their third studio album, Minutes to Midnight. The single was released on August 17, 2007.

On July 30, 2007, the music video was shown on MTV Germany and MTV Asia and has premiered in Canada through the Muchmusic Countdown and their MuchAxs video streaming website. This song was #44 on Rolling Stones list of the 100 Best Songs of 2007. This song was also #83 on MTV Asias list of Top 100 Hits of 2007.

The song is featured in the closing video package in Game 3 of the 2007 World Series, and in the main setlist for the rhythm video game Guitar Hero: Warriors of Rock.

Background information

"Bleed It Out" is the first of two tracks on the album to contain rap vocals from Mike Shinoda, with the other being "Hands Held High". It is also the second track of the 3 songs in the album to contain profanity (aside from "Given Up" and "Hands Held High"). In addition to the profanity, the word "noose" in the first verse was censored in music videos which appeared on MTV and VH1, though it can still be still heard on the radio edit and edited album version of the song.

The main guitar riff of "Bleed It Out" which repeats throughout a majority of the song came as a result of guitarist Brad Delson playing a note incorrectly, thus explaining the song's working title of "Accident".

In the album booklet, it says that the song was largely a product of the band simply "Enjoying the process" of making the album. Furthermore, Mike Shinoda stated that the lyrics to this track were difficult to perfect, as he re-wrote the lyrics to this song about a "hundred times" (referenced to in the first line of the song: "Here we go for the hundredth time") until the band was satisfied with them.

The song is the shortest track on Minutes to Midnight, besides the instrumental intro, "Wake". However, in live performances the song's bridge is often extended to include a drum solo by Rob Bourdon. In Road to Revolution, the song also includes a "singing contest" led by Chester and Mike which is omitted in the CD version.

It was first performed live during the show at Webster Hall in New York City on May 11, 2007. Other notable live performances of the song include when it was performed in Tokyo on July 7, 2007, and broadcast as part of Live Earth, The Concerts for a Climate in Crisis, as well as when it was performed on the May 12, 2007, episode of Saturday Night Live.  Linkin Park also performed the song at the 2007 MTV Video Music Awards, with an added hip-hop intro to the song by Timbaland, as well as various laser effects during the performance.

A live version of the song was included as the b-side of "Shadow of the Day".

In the A Thousand Suns World Tour, the drum solo was removed and pieces of "Burning in the Skies" and "A Place for My Head" were added to the song.

Music video

The song's music video was directed by Joe Hahn and premiered on July 31, 2007, on MTV Germany. The music video was premiered in the United States on August 6, 2007, all day long on MTV2's "Unleashed". It also had a premiere on TRL the same day as MTV2's "Unleashed". It debuted at number 27 on the Muchmusic Countdown on August 3. Although "Leave Out All The Rest" (the track before it) features footsteps and an opening door that segues into "Bleed It Out", it was omitted for the music video. The video was filmed and then reversed (in what appears to be one continuous shot), although green screens were used to make it look like the band was still playing regularly. The video features a reversed bar fight, and at the end of the video, it is revealed that a person vomited on another person's shoe, which started the massive fight.

The video was named Muchmusic's #1 Rock video of 2007 during their annual Holiday Wrap specialty program series. Also, at the 2008 MuchMusic Video Awards, "Bleed It Out" won for Best International Video – Group.

Warner Bros. Records released a live video of "Bleed it Out" exclusively on their YouTube channel. The live video was shot in Japan on July 7, 2007, when Linkin Park was performing during the Live Earth concert. The Warner Records version censors "fuck" and "noose". However, other users have uploaded the same performance but some may have been captured from networks like NBC and MSN, which may have the lyrics uncensored.

As of February 2023, the music video for "Bleed It Out" has over 135 million views on YouTube.

Live performances
"Bleed It Out" includes a slow chorus breakdown at the end, and Rob Bourdon's extended drum solo.

For the 2010 A Thousand Suns World Tour, it was originally performed between "Crawling" and "One Step Closer" as the second-to-last number of the main set for the South American leg. It was moved to the encore as the final number for the European leg of the tour. On their recent EMA's performance, they played the song with "A Place for My Head" mixed into the end. This song was played with "Burning in the Skies" in the same tour in some dates.

In Living Things World Tour, the band plays two verses from Beastie Boys Sabotage in memory of Beastie Boys bassist MCA who died in 2012.

During Linkin Park's "Concert For The Philippines" in January 2014, the song was performed featuring a drum solo from Travis Barker.

On June 22, 2014, at the Vans Warped Tour in Ventura, CA,  Linkin Park performed the song with rapper Machine Gun Kelly who came up with a third verse taken from his song "What I Do".

Commercial performance
The song ranked in music charts even before its official release. The song peaked at #52 on the Billboard US Hot 100 and #54 on the Billboard Pop 100. Although the song is the band's first charting single on Modern Rock Tracks to not reach the #1 spot since "Pts.Of.Athrty" in 2002 stalled at #29, it did however hold the #2 spot on the chart for nine consecutive weeks then got replaced by Three Days Grace's Never Too Late at the #2 spot, being held off from the #1 spot by Foo Fighters' "The Pretender". It also reached #3 on the Mainstream Rock Tracks charts. In the UK, it debuted and peaked at #29. It made the top thirty in Australia, Canada, Poland and Israel. To date, it has been less successful than its predecessor "What I've Done" that debuted at #1 on the Modern Rock Tracks chart and the following single "Shadow of the Day" where both singles charted higher. However, it has peaked higher than "What I've Done" in the New Zealand Singles Chart (#7) and Belgian Singles Chart (#22). Additionally, it was more successful on the Mainstream Rock Tracks and the Modern Rock Tracks chart than the other singles from Minutes to Midnight staying at 36 weeks on the Modern Rock Tracks chart, making it their third most successful single behind "In The End" (44 weeks) and "Faint" (37 weeks) on the rock charts.

As of June 2014, "Bleed It Out" has sold over 1,920,000 copies in the US, making it the band's 7th highest selling single of all time in the US.

Track listings

Charts

Weekly charts

Certifications

References

Linkin Park songs
2007 songs
2007 singles
Song recordings produced by Rick Rubin
Songs written by Mike Shinoda
Warner Records singles